SNSD is a South Korean girl group also known as Girls' Generation.

SNSD may also refer to:

 Alliance of Independent Social Democrats
 Smackover-Norphlet School District
 SNSD (netsukuku), Scattered Name Service Disgregation in the distributed hostname management system ANDNA

See also
SSND